The 1992 IIHF European U18 Championship was the twenty-fifth playing of the IIHF European Junior Championships.

Group A
Played April 5–12 in Lillehammer and Hamar, Norway

First round
Group 1

Group 2

Final round
Championship round

7th place

Switzerland was relegated to Group B for 1993.  Czechoslovakia competed for the last time, the Czech Republic assumed their spot in Group A and Slovakia began playing in Group C in 1993.

Tournament Awards
Top Scorer  David Výborný (14 points)
Top Goalie: Marc Seliger
Top Defenceman:Sergei Gonchar
Top Forward: David Výborný

Group B 
Played March 22–28 in Pralognan-la-Vanoise, Méribel and Courchevel, France.

First round
Group 1

Group 2

Final round 
Championship round

Placing round

Italy was promoted to Group A and Yugoslavia was relegated to Group C, for 1993.
With the breakup of the Socialist Federal Republic of Yugoslavia in 1991 and 1992, the Federal Republic of Yugoslavia assumed their place, but did not participate again until 1995.  Also two new former republics would appear in the next championship, Slovenia and Croatia.

Group C 
Played March 19–22 in Eindhoven of the Netherlands.

Hungary was promoted to Group B for 1993.

References

Complete results

Junior
IIHF European Junior Championship tournament
IIHF European Junior
International ice hockey competitions hosted by Norway
Junior
Sport in Lillehammer
Sport in Hamar
March 1992 sports events in Europe
Junior
International ice hockey competitions hosted by France
International ice hockey competitions hosted by the Netherlands
Junior
Sports competitions in Eindhoven
20th century in Eindhoven